JSC "Domodedovo Airlines" ( OAO Aviakompaniya Domodedovskiye Avialinii) was an airline with its head office on the grounds of Domodedovo International Airport in Domodedovsky District, Moscow Oblast, Russia. It operated scheduled flights within Russia and the CIS, with a focus on flights to the Russian Far East. The airline also operated scheduled and ad hoc charter flights to P. R. China, Europe, Thailand, Maldives, Malaysia and Singapore.

Destinations

Fleet 
The Domodedovo Airlines fleet included the following aircraft (as of March 2007):

References

External links 

  (2004–2008)
  

Companies based in Moscow
Former Aeroflot divisions
Airlines established in 1964
Defunct airlines of Russia
Airlines disestablished in 2008